Bardovci is a village in the municipality of Karpoš, North Macedonia.

Name
The name of the village is derived from a proto-Albanian substrate from the form Bard-Bardh (white) alongside the suffix ovci.

Demographics
According to the 1467-68 Ottoman defter, Bardovci appears as being inhabited by a Muslim population. The household heads' names are: Ali servant of Halil, Musa son of Abdullah, Ajdin servant of Haxhi Bula, Shahin son of Abdullah.

As of the 2021 census, Bardovci had 2,291 residents with the following ethnic composition:
Macedonians 2,075
Persons for whom data are taken from administrative sources 109
Serbs 42
Others 65

According to the 2002 census, the village had a total of 1,472 inhabitants. Ethnic groups in the village include:
Macedonians 1,432
Serbs 33
Romani 2 
Others 7

Sports
Local football club FK Lepenec has played in the Macedonian Third League twice.

References

External links

Villages in Karpoš Municipality